Dalecarlians  is a 2004 Swedish film starring Sofia Helin. The word "masjävlar" is a derogatory term for Dalecarlians, who are usually known as masar.

Cast 
 Sofia Helin as Mia
 Kajsa Ernst as Eivor
 Ann Petrén as Gunilla
 Barbro Enberg as Barbro
 Joakim Lindblad as Jan-Olof
 Inga Ålenius as Anna
 Willie Andréason as Calle
 Lars-Gunnar Aronsson as Ingvar
 Peter Jankert as Tommy
 Maja Andersson as Ida
 Alf Nilsson as Tore

External links 
 
 

2004 films
Swedish comedy-drama films
2000s Swedish-language films
Best Film Guldbagge Award winners
Films set in Dalarna
2000s Swedish films